Tongjing Beilu Station is a station of Line 1, Suzhou Rail Transit. The station is located in Gusu District of Suzhou. It has been in use since April 28, 2012, the same time of the operation of Line 1.

Station

Accessible Information
 Tongjing Beilu Station is a fully accessible station, this station equipped with wheelchair accessible elevators, blind paths with bumps, and wheelchair ramps. These facilities can help people with disabilities, seniors, youths, and pregnancies travel through Suzhou Rail Transit system.

Station configurations
L1 (First Floor/Street Level): Entrances/Exits (stairs and escalators); and elevators with wheelchair accessible ramps.

B1 (Mezzanine/Station Hall Level): Station Control Room; Customer Service; Automatic Ticket Vending Machines; Automatic Fee Collection Systems with turnstiles; stairs and escalators; and elevators with wheelchair accessible ramps.

B2 (Platform Level): Platform; toilet; stairs and escalators; elevators with wheelchair accessible ramps.

Station layout

First & Last Trains

Exits Information
Exit 1: South-West Corner of Tongjing Lu and Ganjiang Lu

Exit 2: South-East Corner of  Tongjing Lu and Ganjiang Lu

Exit 3: North-East Corner of  Tongjing Lu and Ganjiang Lu

Exit 4: North-West Corner of Tongjing Lu and Ganjiang Lu

Exit 5: North-West Corner of Tongjing Lu and Ganjiang Lu

Local Attractions
Suzhou People's Government
Suzhou People's Procuratorate
Suzhou Radio and TV University
Marriott Suzhou Hotel
HongQiao ShiJia Garden
HongQiao Merchants Building
YinTai Garden
CaiXiang XinCun
CaiXiang ErCun
Caixiang Garden
Suzhou JiangChang Foreign Language School
DianZi XinCun
Suzhou Real Estate Building

Bus Connections
Bus Stop: HongQiao - Connection Bus Routes: 9, 60, 64, 332, 333, 333 LongChi Special Line, 935

Bus Stop: Guwu Fandian - Connection Bus Routes: 35, 50, 54, 64, 69, 69 Lessened Line, 315, 317, 400, Tour 5

Bus Stop: CaiXiangXinCun Xi- Connection Bus Routes: 2, 35, 50, 54, 69, 69 Lessened Line, 88, 262, 303, 315, 317, 400, 502, 900, 935, Tour 5

Bus Stop: CaiXiangXinCun Bei - Connection Bus Routes: 2, 9, 60, 88, 262, 303, 332, 333, 333 LongChi Special Line, 900

References

Railway stations in Jiangsu
Suzhou Rail Transit stations
Railway stations in China opened in 2012